Kemnal may refer to:

Kemnal Technology College, a secondary school and sixth form college located in the London Borough of Bromley, England
The Kemnal Academies Trust, a multi-academy trust serving a family of schools mainly in Kent and West Sussex, England
Kemnal Park Cemetery & Memorial Gardens a privately owned cemetery in the London Borough of Bromley, England.
James Kemnal (1864 – 1927) an English engineer and industrialist

See also